Mowmenabad (also Romanized as Mowmenābād and Mo’menābād) is a village in Qanavat Rural District, in the Central District of Qom County, Qom Province, Iran. At the 2006 census, its population was 666, in 157 families.

References 

Populated places in Qom Province